Poratam is a 1983 Telugu-language action drama film, produced by S. Ramachandra Rao under the SR Films banner and directed by Kodi Ramakrishna. It stars Krishna, Jaya Sudha and Master Mahesh Babu, with music composed by Chakravarthy.

Cast

Krishna as Krishna Murthy 
Jaya Sudha as Sudha 
Master Mahesh Babu as Bujji 
Rao Gopal Rao as Nagabhushana Rao 
Gollapudi Maruthi Rao as Garupmantha Rao
Jaggayya as Lawyer Chandra Shekar 
Kanta Rao as Ranganayakulu
Siva Krishna as Murari
Rajendra Prasad as Tailor Appa Rao
P. L. Narayana as Varma 
Raj Varma as Chandram
Dr. Siva Prasad as Gurunatham 
Sharada as Rajani Devi / Rajamma
Anjali Devi as Parvathi 
Poornima as Nalini 
Srilakshmi as Gajalakshmi

Soundtrack

Music composed by Chakravarthy. Music released on AVM Audio Company.

References

Indian action drama films
Films directed by Kodi Ramakrishna
Films scored by K. Chakravarthy
1980s action drama films
1980s Telugu-language films